PlanetSide 2 is a free-to-play massively multiplayer online first-person shooter developed by Rogue Planet Games and published by Daybreak Game Company. The game supports battles with thousands of players (up to 2,000 on a single map) and incorporates modern first-person shooter mechanics. Six different infantry classes and over 18 ground and air vehicles are available to players and interact on the battlefield to simulate combined arms warfare. As a re-imagining of PlanetSide, PlanetSide 2 chronicles the efforts of three factions fighting for territorial control of the planet Auraxis.

Along with its prequel, PlanetSide 2 is one of the very few MMOFPS games to have ever released, and is presently considered the most successful title in the genre. ForgeLight, a proprietary game engine, is used to support high player counts while retaining performance and graphical fidelity. PlanetSide 2 operates on a games as a service business model and is supported by microtransaction purchases. Since its launch, the game has received regular updates which have introduced new content and mechanics.

PlanetSide 2 received positive attention from critics and was praised for its scale, innovation, and graphics, but some reviewers were divided over the game's free-to-play model, technical glitches, and difficulty for new players. PlanetSide 2 currently holds the Guinness World Record for "Most players in an online FPS battle," which was set when 1,158 players were recorded in a single battle during an official event. This record has since been beaten in both 2020 and 2022, with even higher player counts being recorded on the game's live servers.

Gameplay

PlanetSide 2 is a first-person shooter that takes place on a persistent open world which supports up to 2,000 concurrent players on one seamless map. Compared to its predecessor, PlanetSide 2 is faster-paced, allowing players to instantly teleport into the largest battles with the "Instant Action" function, as well as access jump pads and vehicles for rapid transit. Modern first-person shooter elements such as sprinting, iron sights, and regenerating shields are also present in core gameplay. Working with their empire, players attempt to gain control of the planet Auraxis by capturing and defending territories, earning global benefits if they successfully lock down an entire continent. Players can choose between 6 distinct infantry classes and use multiple ground and air vehicles, each of which play unique roles on the battlefield.

Character progression
Upon creating a character, players join one of three factions: the New Conglomerate (NC), Terran Republic (TR), or Vanu Sovereignty (VS). Upon reaching Battle Rank 20, players can also choose to join the Nanite Systems Operatives (NSO), an unaligned faction of robot mercenaries. Each faction has a unique backstory, visual style, and arsenal that emphasizes specific traits. For example, TR weapons resemble contemporary military technology and often have a higher rate of fire, while the VS arsenal employs alien technology and tends to favor accuracy.

Players gain Experience Points (XP) by killing enemies, aiding allies, and capturing objectives. As players increase their Battle Rank they earn currency (Certs) which can be used to unlock ability upgrades and new weapons. Rather than serving as direct upgrades, unlockable weapons provide tradeoffs, often sacrificing versatility to perform better at a specific role. Players are able to specialize into specific classes or vehicles with Certs to better fit a their preferred playstyle. Daybreak Cash (DBC), a premium currency, is purchasable with real-world funds and unlocks weapons and cosmetic items; weapons bought with DBC are functionally identical to those purchasable with Certs.

Classes and vehicles
PlanetSide 2 features six classes, each of which possess distinct abilities. Although each class serves a unique role on the battlefield, customization options allow players to specialize into certain playstyles.

The Infiltrator has access to a cloaking device and motion detection tools that reveal enemy positions. Infiltrators can also hack enemy terminals to make them useable by allies. The class equips a bolt action sniper rifle by default.
The Light Assault class emphasizes mobility and has a jet pack that allows users to reach rooftops and other typically inaccessible flanking positions. By default, the class equips a carbine to combat infantry as well as a rocket rifle capable of damaging vehicles.
The Combat Medic is a support class capable of rapidly healing and reviving allies on the front lines using a medical applicator and revive grenades. The class equips an assault rifle that remains effective at range by default.
The Engineer is able to repair damaged vehicles, MAX suits and mechanical objects, as well as deploy a number of tools including a personal turret, ammo packs and a sentry gun. The class equips a carbine by default.
The Heavy Assault functions as a shock troop capable of absorbing large amounts of damage with its overshield ability. The class has both anti-infantry and anti-vehicle capabilities with its high-capacity light machine guns and rocket launchers.
The MAX (Mechanized Assault Exo-Suit) can take significantly more damage than pure infantry classes and equips two arm-mounted heavy weapons. As a hybrid vehicle, the MAX trips tank mines and costs Nanites to use.

Players can spawn vehicles from friendly terminals at the cost of resources. Certain vehicles are available to every player regardless of allegiance. Such ground vehicles include the Flash ATV, Harasser buggy, Lightning light tank, and Sunderer armoured personnel carrier. Air vehicles available to all players include the Valkyrie and Galaxy transport aircraft and Liberator gunship. Players can also use a main battle tank and air superiority fighter unique to their faction. In combat, each vehicle serves a designated role - for example, the Galaxy can rapidly transport up to 12 players across a continent, while the Sunderer becomes a spawn point when deployed.

Territory control
Each of PlanetSide 2s main continents are approximately 64 sq. km. in size, and are populated by numerous facilities varying in size and layout. These territories are connected by a "Lattice Link" system to direct player flow, where a faction must own a linked and uncontested facility prior to capturing any location. When certain conditions are met, the Alert in-game event is triggered, which provides all players with XP and Cert rewards. The empire that owns the most territory at the end of the event locks down the entire continent, encouraging fights to take place across different locations.

PlanetSide 2 also features a construction system that allows players to build their own bases. Player bases can serve both offensive and defensive purposes, as well as provide front line vehicles, resources, and spawn points to nearby allies. Constructed bases consist of prefabricated fortifications, weapons and terminals. The creation of these bases requires Cortium, a mineral that is harvested from natural deposits using the Advanced Nanite Transport (ANT) vehicle.

Player organization
As PlanetSide 2 emphasizes organized strategy, the game features a command hierarchy system. Players can join squads of up to 12 individuals, which can be subdivided into fireteams for specific roles. Up to four squads (48 players) can associate and become a platoon. Each squad in a platoon has its own in-game voice over IP channel, which allow leaders to direct specific groups of players in the same platoon to different objectives.

Outfits are persistent player-run organizations that function as PlanetSide 2s clan system. The dominant Outfit that captures a facility gains resources, which can be crafted into tactical tools which include on-demand vehicles, shield bubbles, and orbital strikes. Outfits can also call down massive spacecraft known as Bastion Fleet Carriers to the battlefield for a limited amount of time, which are capable of providing ground and air support. Outfit Wars, a limited-time in-game event, allows Outfits to compete against each other in a competitive setting.

Plot

In the year 2444, a mysterious wormhole forms over a war-torn Earth, and scientists report strange transmissions that all but confirm the existence of extraterrestrial life. The wormhole is predicted to re-open again in a century, and fear of a hostile, alien presence causes the global conflict to end. Nations around the world quickly agreed to a peace treaty and formed the Terran Republic, an authoritarian but benevolent United Nations-like organization that worked toward the peace and prosperity of humankind. As expected, the wormhole reopens after 100 years, but no further transmissions are detected; despite this, the Terran Republic remains in power, as the vast majority of humanity is satisfied with its governance.

Years later, explorer Thomas Connery discovers a segment of the Kuiper belt he dubs "the Moon Belt." Connery is voted into the position of Terran Republic president soon after. Suspecting the discovery of alien technology, multiple business leaders form the New Conglomerate, a libertarian organization seeking to capitalize on the discovery and free themselves from strict Terran Republic control. After his retirement, Connery recruits eccentric xenobiologist Henry Briggs for a second expedition to the Moon Belt, and the pair discovers an alien figurine. Upon touching the artifact, Briggs experiences a revelation and is left with a single message: "Vanu."

The wormhole appears yet again in 2640, and this time Connery leads an expedition consisting of Terran Republic officers, New Conglomerate representatives, and scientists seeking extraterrestrial knowledge. The wormhole collapses before the entire fleet is able to pass through, however, and 40,000 individuals are trapped on the other side, unable to return to Earth. Months pass, and as chances for survival become increasingly bleak, New Conglomerate insurgents begin launching attacks against Terran Republic forces, killing Connery in the process. In response, draconian laws are forced upon all passengers by the Terran Republic. The scientists onboard, led by Briggs, begin to distance themselves from both sides of the conflict.

Finally, the hospitable moon of a gas giant, named "New Earth" (later renamed Auraxis), is located by researchers aboard the ships. Upon arrival, the human survivors begin to terraform and colonize Auraxis. The New Conglomerate and Terran Republic break off from each other, and no major conflicts occur between the two sides for the next two centuries. Despite this, tensions continue to rise between the two groups, culminating in a declaration of all-out war after conflicting reports of a violent attack. A group of dedicated scientists, inspired by Briggs' revelation and Vanu artifacts discovered on Auraxis, announce they can no longer remain neutral and declare themselves the Vanu Sovereignty.

Soon after the beginning of the war, rebirthing technology was developed, granting immortality to soldiers of all three empires. Through the use of nanites, each faction is able to rapidly produce vehicles, weapons, and other equipment for use in combat. With effectively unlimited resources available to each side, Auraxis has remained in unending turmoil, with no end in sight to the conflict.

Development

Initial development for a new PlanetSide game began as PlanetSide Next, a free-to-play team deathmatch shooter utilizing the original PlanetSide game engine with all new graphics. Development took place at SOGA, a Sony Online Entertainment (SOE) studio based in Taiwan; the game was intended for Asian markets and would compete with established first-person shooters like Crossfire. Upon SOGA's shutdown, the project was transferred to SOE San Diego, where the potential for a proper sequel was evaluated.

The first official indications of an upcoming PlanetSide sequel appeared in 2009. On September 25, SOE sent a mass e-mail to current and former PlanetSide subscribers, asking them to fill out a survey that would help SOE design the next installment of PlanetSide. On October 11, SOE president John Smedley posted on his LiveJournal account that the sequel's working title is PlanetSide Next. In December 2010, Smedley announced that SOE would be launching a first-person shooter in March 2011, which was soon confirmed by Paul Williams of SOE as referring to PlanetSide Next. On March 31, 2011, SOE announced that it would be ending development of their spy-themed MMO The Agency and refocusing efforts on EverQuest Next and PlanetSide Next.

Although development began using the same underlying base as PlanetSide, the project later switched to a modern implementation of the EverQuest MMO engine, which had been used to create Free Realms and Clone Wars Adventures. ForgeLight, a proprietary renderer, was created from scratch for use with the existing engine. Smedley publicly announced that PlanetSide Next had been delayed – the result of recently switching to the new engine – and would be available later in the year. Development was completed for PlanetSide 2 within 18 months, a very short time span, which was made possible by the networking technology and server infrastructure already owned by SOE.

Vehicle designs for PlanetSide Next, including those of the Galaxy aircraft and a New Conglomerate tank, were teased in early 2011 by Smedley. The game's working title was changed to PlanetSide 2 later that year, shortly before the game's website was updated with a trailer showing early gameplay and the new graphics. The game was revealed to be a "reimagining" of PlanetSide, with faster-paced first-person shooter mechanics, "triple-A" graphics, and a greater focus on capturing and defending territories. During the 2011 SOE Fan Faire, Smedley publicly announced that both PlanetSide 2 and EverQuest Next would use ForgeLight to support seamless worlds and realistic physics using Nvidia's PhysX API. SOE announced later in 2011 that comic book writer Marv Wolfman would be authoring episodic stories to establish the game's background and expand upon PlanetSides original backstory.

Throughout the game's development, John Smedley and creative director Matt Higby have cited Eve Online as well as both the Call of Duty and Battlefield series as major influences for PlanetSide 2. Smedley, an active Eve Online player himself, took inspiration from the game's sandbox-like freedom, resource management, offline progression system and its ability to support a high number of players on one server. Higby has specifically named the vehicle combat mechanics of Battlefield: Bad Company 2 as a major influence, stating that the game had "done the best with vehicles. I want [PlanetSide 2] to be at least that good."

During the 2012 Game Developers Conference, a playable in-development version of PlanetSide 2 was showcased by SOE. Early versions of the game's environment, vehicles, and character progression system were demonstrated, and it was also announced that the game would be free to play. Smedley announced that a closed beta test would begin July 30 or 31 2012 "barring any unforeseen circumstances." On July 30 Smedley announced that the beta testing would be delayed until at least August 3 "to make sure some stuff is awesome." On August 2, Smedley mentioned during a Reddit AMA that a Mac version was planned post-launch, writing: "No you aren't going to see PlanetSide 2 on Linux. You will see it on Mac though". On August 3, Smedley announced that the closed Beta would commence 2pm PDT (GMT-7) Monday 6 August. The beta closed on November 17, 2012, pending the game's official release November 20, 2012.

PlayStation 4 port
Early in the game's development, the ownership of PlanetSide 2 by a subsidiary of Sony Interactive Entertainment led some to speculation regarding a release for PlayStation branded consoles. Smedley hinted at the possibility of a release for the PlayStation 3 throughout 2011 and 2012.

The success of free-to-play games like PlanetSide 2 led Sony to announce that the PlayStation 4 would support free-to-play titles in addition to retail games. On June 5, 2013, SOE announced that both PlanetSide 2 and DC Universe Online would be available to play on the PlayStation 4 later in 2013. It was also announced that a PlayStation Plus subscription would not be required to play the game. The developers planned for the games to be as similar as possible between the PC and PlayStation 4 releases aside from a different UI and support for DualShock 4 controllers, and said that console graphics would match the "Ultra" preset on PC. Cross-platform play between the PlayStation 4 and PC versions of the game would not be possible due to update delays, but the ability to transfer player accounts between the two platforms would be considered. Creative director Matt Higby also mentioned the possibility of porting PlanetSide 2s mobile app to the PlayStation Vita with additional interactive features.

In October 2013, Smedley confirmed that the game's PlayStation 4 release date had been pushed to 2014, but did not provide a reason for the delay. In January 2014, Smedley stated that the game's release was targeted for the first half of the year. Higby confirmed that the game would run at 1080p resolution with a high frame rate in May 2014, and a picture of an in-development version of the game was tweeted by the game's PlayStation 4 producer Clint Worley. Throughout development, the ForgeLight engine was modified to better support multithreading to better use the PlayStation 4's processing power, which improved PC performance as well. More information was revealed at E3 2014 - lead designer Luke Sigmund stated that the game would run between 30 and 60 frames per second, and a new launch trailer was showcased.

SOE stated that a beta for the game be arriving by the end of the year in November 2014, and beta signups opened in December 2014. The beta for the PlayStation 4 version opened on January 20, 2015. The game was officially released on June 23, 2015.

Post-release
During the 2013 Game Developers Conference, more PlanetSide 2 features were unveiled. A companion app for iOS and Android devices in development would allow players to view guides, use the in-game voice chat, track their character, and see a real-time PlanetSide 2 world map. Future updates to the app would allow users to affect battles by launching "drone strikes or orbital strikes" according to senior art director Tramell Isaac. The app was released in April 2013.

In 2019, PlanetSide 2 was upgraded to use DirectX 11, while it had previously been using DirectX 9. This update provided significant improvements to performance and hardware compatibility.

Linux support for PlanetSide 2 was enabled using the Proton compatibility layer during November 2021, which had not been possible prior to anti-cheat service BattlEye adding Proton support.

Business model

PlanetSide 2 is free-to-play and includes microtransactions that allow players to purchase in-game convenience items and cosmetics. The game also offers a monthly subscription that provides cash shop discounts, an XP multiplier, and increased resource generation. Although guns and cosmetics can be directly purchased with the game's premium currency, upgrades that grant direct advantages can only be unlocked through gameplay.

The game's developers have indicated an admiration of the freemium business model presented in League of Legends. During PlanetSide 2s development, SOE president John Smedley said the game would "not sell a more powerful gun or vehicle," with purchases using real-life money being only an alternative to unlocking items through gameplay. In 2012, creative director Matt Higby elaborated on PlanetSide 2s business model, stating that "no weapon, vehicle, attachment, continent, class or certification" would be inaccessible by free-to-play characters post-launch.

In 2017, Implants were released, which were time-limited perks obtained through loot boxes purchasable with in-game currency and Daybreak Cash. The system was initially received negatively by players due to perceived unfairness, leading the development team to entirely redesign the feature.

Players are able to create cosmetic items (such as helmets, armors, and decals) for the game with the Player Studio, a revenue sharing program where the creator of the item is paid each time their in-game item is purchased. Some participants have earned thousands of dollars from their creations.

Release

PlanetSide 2 launched on November 20, 2012. The PlayStation 4 version of PlanetSide 2 officially released on June 23, 2015.

Multiple localizations of PlanetSide 2 have been published internationally. The game was published in Europe by ProSiebenSat.1 Games, and a retail version of the game with special bonuses was released in 2013 by ProSiebenSat.1 and Koch Media. ProSiebenSat.1 ended their partnership with SOE in 2014 and allowed players to transfer their progress to SOE starting July 1, 2014. A localization for Russia and the Commonwealth of Independent States was published by Innova.

A version of the game localized for China was released in June 2013 by The9, and had higher initial player counts than the US servers according to SOE president John Smedley. The Chinese release was shut down on May 31, 2016 by The9 to focus their efforts on the release of Firefall. A localized version of PlanetSide 2 was published in South Korea in 2014 as part of SOE's partnership with Daum Communications. Due to incompatibilities with the game's cash shop and low player counts, the Korean service shut down in 2015.

Promotion

Prior to the game's launch in 2012, demos of PlanetSide 2 were showcased at numerous gaming conventions which included the San Diego Comic-Con, ChinaJoy, PAX Prime, Gamescom, the Game Developers Conference, E3 2012, and SOE Live. The official cinematic trailer for the game produced by Blur Studio titled "Death is No Excuse" was unveiled at ChinaJoy.

Shortly after PlanetSide 2s official release, SOE partnered with Internet personalities TotalBiscuit (John Bain), SeaNanners (Adam Montoya), and Tobuscus (Toby Turner, later replaced by LevelCap Gaming) for the "Ultimate Empire Showdown", an event where each YouTuber represented one of the game's factions. Bain, a long-time PlanetSide fan, had begun working with SOE to promote PlanetSide 2 before the game's release and hosted a live showcase of the game during E3 2012. Bain was allowed access to the game during its development stages and regularly livestreamed early gameplay with the developers.

A partnership was established with Wikia to create the first ever "Wikia Official Community," providing exclusive content and support for the game's wiki. SOE also partnered with esports organization Major League Gaming to establish PlanetSide 2 as a competitive video game. The game was featured at MLG's Winter Championship Pro Circuit event in 2013, and both the event and additional programming were broadcast on MLG's own network and Twitch.

PlanetSide 2 was also showcased at E3 2013. In 2014, the PlayStation 4 release of the game was showcased at PAX Prime and E3 2014.

World record
On January 24, 2015, PlanetSide 2 broke the Guinness World Record for "Most players in an online FPS battle" when 1,158 players simultaneously took part in a fight. The event was organized by SOE and community organization PlanetSide Battles, and took place on the game's Jaeger competitive server. The record had been previously held by Man vs. Machine, a browser-based first person shooter.

In 2020, the record was beat unofficially when 1,283 players participated in a single battle. While the 2015 record had been set as part of a sponsored event, the new record resulted from a player surge driven by the "Escalation" update and global COVID-19 lockdowns.

The world record was beaten yet again multiple times in 2022 as part of the game's 10th anniversary celebration. A peak of 1,530 players was recorded on a single continent prior to a server crash, with the highest stable player count reaching 1,241.

Even larger unrecorded battles have occurred throughout the game's lifespan, with up to 2,000 players fighting at a single location. Writing for Eurogamer, Rick Lane estimated that 7,000-28,000 players could have participated at the same conflict simultaneously during the "Battle for the Bastion," a cross-server event.

Reception

PlanetSide 2 received "generally favorable reviews" from critics, according to review aggregator Metacritic.

Critics praised the large scale battles, impressive graphics and free-to-play model. Charles Onyett of IGN gave the game a score of 9/10, writing that the combined arms warfare of PlanetSide 2 is "often breathtaking, as lines of tanks fire at bases while aircraft light up the sky and hundreds of players fill the scene with healing beams and lethal weapons fire." Onyett also praised the game's "versatile classes, deep progression systems and various styles of air and ground vehicles," but noted "some polish issues" and small glitches present in the game. Writing for GameSpot, Tyler Hicks held the same opinion, writing that "the massive scale of battles to the detail put into the sprawling continents" allowed the game to "[surpass] its predecessor in nearly every regard," but similarly noticed small issues with "population disadvantages or the occasional crash." In his review, Craig Pearson of GameSpy praised the game's "gorgeous lighting and huge draw distances" and "intense, multiplayer battles," but noted that the game's leadership and coordination aspects could use improvement. Richard Cobbett of Eurogamer enjoyed the game's "epic scale," and regarded the game as "not quite the best of both worlds, but certainly the best attempt anyone has ever made to fuse [an MMO and FPS] together."

Patrick Hancock of Destructoid found issue with the game's business model and need for grinding, writing that PlanetSide 2 is a "wonderful game, hampered by the fact that it’s free-to-play." Hancock noted that the game "doesn’t do a great job of explaining the many systems at play" and criticized the lack of long-term goals for a player to achieve. Though Griffin McElroy of Polygon praised PlanetSide 2s gameplay and scale, they noted that, for microtransactions, "prices escalate quickly" and that the amount of time needed to unlock a single item with in-game currency could be "excessive." Jonathan Leack of GameRevolution noted frequent glitches, with "people teleporting and rubber-banding," which led the game to feel like a "rushed job" at times.

The PlayStation 4 release of the game received similarly positive attention from critics. Multiple reviewers found an increase in technical bugs. Jeff Marchiafava of Game Informer praised the game's player progression speed and "solid" gameplay, but found that the game can feel like it "lacks a point" and noted that its "technical implementation [was] far from perfect." Likewise, Kevin VanOrd of GameSpot praised the game's "fantastic massive battles" but found that its enjoyment "rests on how forgiving you are of technical hiccups you would properly expect to be vanquished."

Awards
PlanetSide 2 won several awards from video game publications at E3 2012. IGN awarded it "Best MMO Game"; GameSpy awarded it "Best Shooter", "Best Free-to-Play" and "Best PC Exclusive"; Digital Trends awarded it "Best MMO"; Polygon awarded it "Editor's Choice"; and from PC Gamer, "Best Shooter", "Best MMO", "Best of Show" and "Most Awards Received". The game received numerous other awards and nominations as well.

References

External links
 

2012 video games
Active massively multiplayer online games
First-person shooters
Science fiction shooter video games
Free-to-play video games
Massively multiplayer online first-person shooter games
Open-world video games
PlayStation 4 Pro enhanced games
PlayStation 4 games
Video games developed in the United States
Video games set on fictional planets
Windows games
The9 games
Innova (video game company) games
First-person shooter multiplayer online games
Multiplayer online games
Video game sequels